This is a comprehensive listing of releases by Jamie Foxx, an American actor, singer, and comedian.

Studio albums

Singles

As lead artist

As featured artist

Other charted songs

Guest appearances

Production discography

Notes

References

Featured singles chart positions
[ "Slow Jamz" Billboard Charts]. Billboard. Retrieved December 31, 2007.
[ "Gold Digger" Billboard Charts]. Billboard. Retrieved December 31, 2007.
[ "Live in the Sky" Billboard Charts]. Billboard. Retrieved December 31, 2007.

External links
Jamie Foxx's official website 
[ Jamie Foxx] at Allmusic
Jamie Foxx  at ASCAP

Comedian discographies
Discographies of American artists
Discography
Pop music discographies